Heidi Eisterlehner (born 25 October 1949) is a retired tennis player from Germany who was active from the mid-1970s to the mid-1980s.

Early life
She was born in Burg bei Magdeburg, East Germany but moved in her youth to Nuremberg, where she started playing at the local club 1. FC Nürnberg. She studied social pedagogy.

Career
Her best singles result at a Grand Slam tournament came in 1976 when she reached the quarterfinals at the Australian Open. In the second round, she defeated fourth-seeded Sue Barker.

She won the singles title at the Auckland Open, a non-tour event, in January 1977 after a victory in the final against Karen Krantzcke. In May that year, Eisterlehner reached the singles final at the German Open in Hamburg. Also in 1977 she won the national indoor singles title in Hamburg.

In 1976 and 1978, she participated in five ties as a member of the German Fed Cup team and compiled a 3–2 win–loss record.

WTA Tour finals

Singles (0–1)

Doubles (0–2)

References

External links
 
 

1949 births
West German female tennis players
Sportspeople from Magdeburg
Living people